is a junction railway station located in the city of Sakaide, Kagawa Prefecture, Japan. It is operated by JR Shikoku and has the station number "Y05".

Lines
Sanuki-Fuchū Station is served by the JR Shikoku Yosan Line and is located 14.2 km from the beginning of the line at Takamatsu. Only local services stop at the station. These trains also stop at Sanuki-Fuchū.

Layout
The station, which is unstaffed, consists of two opposed side platforms serving two tracks on an embankment. There is no station building but weather shelters are provided on both platforms for waiting passengers. Flights of steps lead up to each platform from ground level. Access to the opposite platform is by means of a pedestrian tunnel under the embankment. A designated parking space for bicycles is provided near the station.

Adjacent stations

History
Sanuki-Fuchū Station opened on 27 January 1952 as an additional stop on the existing Yosan Line. At this time the station was operated by Japanese National Railways (JNR). With the privatization of JNR on 1 April 1987, control of the station passed to JR Shikoku.

Surrounding area
Lake Fuchu
School for Special Needs Education, Faculty of Education, Kagawa University

See also
 List of railway stations in Japan

References

External links

Station timetable

Railway stations in Kagawa Prefecture
Railway stations in Japan opened in 1952
Sakaide, Kagawa